The Kingsbridge Estuary (also, erroneously, known as the 'Salcombe Estuary') in the South Hams area of Devon, England runs from Kingsbridge in the north to its mouth at the English Channel near Salcombe and lies between Bolt Head and Sharpitor to the west and Portlemouth Down to the east. Several of its creeks have independent names, including Blanksmill, Frogmore, Southpool, Batson and Bowcombe Creek (the most northerly portion of the estuary).

It covers an area of 674ha of which 446 ha are inter-tidal.

The estuary is an extreme example of a ria or drowned river valley caused by rising sea levels rather than a true estuary.  Prior to the sea level rise at the end of the last glacial period, it was the valley of a river. Its size is disproportionate to the size of the small streams which flow into it.

In February 1987 the estuary was designated a Site of Special Scientific Interest. It is a Local Nature Reserve and lies within the South Devon Area of Outstanding Natural Beauty (AONB).

References

Landforms of Devon
Estuaries of England